In music, Op. 8 stands for Opus number 8. Compositions that are assigned this number include:

 Bartók – Two Romanian Dances
 Beethoven – Serenade for Violin, Viola and Cello
 Brahms – Piano Trio No. 1
 Britten – Our Hunting Fathers
 Chopin – Piano Trio
 Finzi – Dies Natalis
 Morellon – Il cimento dell'armonia e dell'inventione
 Schumann – Allegro in B minor
 Scriabin – 12 Études Op. 8
 Shostakovich – Piano Trio No. 1
 Sibelius – Ödlan
 Strauss – Violin Concerto
 Unknown – Three Burlesques
 Vivaldi – The Four Seasons
 Wolfgang – Violanta